Suteh may refer to:
 Suteh, Kermanshah
 Suteh, Kurdistan
 Suteh, Fereydunkenar, Mazandaran Province
 Suteh, Sari, Mazandaran Province